Fuse Services Framework is an open source SOAP and REST web services platform based on Apache CXF for use in enterprise IT organizations. It is productized and supported by the Fuse group at FuseSource Corp. Fuse Services Framework service-enables new and existing systems for use in enterprise SOA infrastructure.

Fuse Services Framework is a pluggable, small-footprint engine that creates high performance, secure and robust services in minutes using front-end programming APIs like JAX-WS and JAX-RS. It supports multiple transports and bindings and is extensible so developers can add bindings for additional message formats so all systems can work together without having to communicate through a centralized server.

Fuse Services Framework is now a part of  Red Hat JBoss Fuse.   

Fabric8 is a free Apache 2.0 Licensed upstream community for the JBoss Fuse product from Red Hat.

See also
Fuse ESB
Message-oriented middleware
Enterprise messaging system
Enterprise Integration Patterns
Service-oriented architecture
Event-driven SOA

External links
JBoss Fuse (Enterprise ServiceMix) web site
CamelOne Conference
Apache ServiceMix getting started resources
Apache ServiceMix web site
JBoss Fuse (Enterprise ServiceMix)  documentation
JBoss Fuse (Enterprise ServiceMix) forums
JBoss Fuse (Enterprise ServiceMix) support
JBoss community web site

Free software distributions
Web services
Web applications